Frederick William David Lester (26 February 1902 – 30 June 1959) was an  Australian rules footballer who played with Hawthorn in the Victorian Football League (VFL).

Notes

External links 

1902 births
1959 deaths
Australian rules footballers from Victoria (Australia)
Hawthorn Football Club players
People educated at Scotch College, Melbourne